Matthew the Leader (Czech: Matěj Vůdce; died 1409 in České Budějovice) was a gang leader who harassed the Rosenberg family and the royal town of České Budějovice in the early 15th century. He operated in the South Bohemian Region.

Matthew himself was likely an impoverished zeman, or part of the lower nobility. They subsisted on road robberies and raids.

Gang activity 
Matthew's gang activities were recorded by the Rosenberg family. It is likely he was supported by nobles who sided with Wenceslaus IV of Bohemia against the League of Lords, such as John Sokol of Lamberg.

Although mainly focused on theft, Matthew also attempted to occupy some castles in South Bohemia. This included an attempt to acquire , administered at the time by Mikuláš of Hus. There were also plans to seize .

In 1407, Henry III of Rosenberg began to crack down on the banditry. Some members began to leave the group, including Žižka. Many members were captured, tried, and executed. Under torture, Matthew himself confessed to several robberies. In response to these crimes, Matthew was hanged in 1409 at České Budějovice.

Notes

References
 Petr Čornej (2003) Tajemství českých kronik - Paseka, Praha, 
 Petr Hora (1991) Toulky českou minulostí (druhý díl) - Práce, Praha, .
 Adolf Kalný (1993) Popravčí kniha pánů z Rožmberka - Státní oblastní archiv Třeboň
 František Šmahel (1969) Jan Žižka z Trocnova – Melantrich, Praha
 Václav Vladivoj Tomek (1993) Jan Žižka - V Ráji, Praha, .

1409 deaths
14th-century births
Date of birth unknown
Czech prisoners sentenced to death
Hajduks